Richard Kidder (1633–1703) was an English Anglican churchman, Bishop of Bath and Wells, from 1691 to his death. He was a noted theologian.

Biography 
He was educated at Emmanuel College, Cambridge, where he was a sizar, from 1649, graduating 1652. He became a Fellow there in 1655, and vicar of Stanground, Huntingdonshire, in 1659. He was deprived in 1662.

He was rector of Rayne Parva, Essex, from 1664 to 1674, having conformed to the Act of 1662. He was later vicar of St. Martin Outwich, London, and in 1689 a royal chaplain, and dean of Peterborough.

His A Demonstration of the Messias has been identified as a significant influence on the librettist Charles Jennens, in writing the words for the Messiah of Handel. This book also took up suggestions of Joseph Mede on multiple authorship of the Book of Zechariah.

He was killed in the Great Storm of 1703, on 26 November (7 December in today's calendar); he was in bed with his wife in the episcopal palace at Wells when the chimney fell on both of them.

Works 
 The Christian sufferer supported (1680)
 A Demonstration of the Messias. In which the Truth of the Christian Religion is Proved, Against All the Enemies Thereof; But Especially Against the Jews. In Three Parts (1684, 1699, 1700)
 A sermon upon the resurrection (1694)
 A Commentary on the Five Books of Moses: With a Dissertation Concerning the Author Or Writer of the said books and a general argument to each of them (1694)
 The life of the Reverend Anthony Horneck, late preacher at the Savoy (1698) 
 The holy Bible, containing the Old and New Testaments (1715)
 A Discourse Concerning Sins of Infirmity, and Wilful Sins, with Another of Restitution (reprint, 2010)

Notes

External links

1633 births
1703 deaths
English theologians
17th-century Church of England bishops
18th-century Church of England bishops
Alumni of Emmanuel College, Cambridge
Deans of Peterborough
Bishops of Bath and Wells
Burials at Wells Cathedral
Natural disaster deaths in England
17th-century Anglican theologians
18th-century Anglican theologians